Tri-Chandra Multiple Campus, more colloquially known as Tri-Chandra College, is a constituent campus of Tribhuvan University located in Ghantaghar, Kathmandu. Found in 1918 by Chandra Shumsher, it is the oldest institute of higher learning in Nepal.

Etymology 
The current name Tri-Chandra is a truncated combination of two words: Tribhuvan for Mahārājādhirāja  Tribhuwan Bir Bikram Shah and Chandra for Rana Prime Minister Chandra Shumsher. The college was originally named Tribhuvan Chandra Intermediate Campus but later renamed and shortened to its current name.

History 
Nepal's first institution of higher education, Tri-Chandra College, was established in 1918 by Chandra Shumsher Jang Bahadur Rana. The college introduced science at the Intermediate level a year later, marking the genesis of formal science education in the country. In 1924, it became a full four year institution with an enrollment of just 30. However, up until the advent of democracy in 1951, the college was not accessible to the general public, but only to a handful of "noble" members of Rana regime. The main purpose of imparting science at that time was to prepare the students for further studies in technical subjects, such as medicine, engineering, agriculture, forestry, etc., in India. The science teaching at Tri-Chandra was upgraded to the Bachelor level (BSc) in 1945. Tri-Chandra was originally affiliated to the University of Calcutta, then to Patna University before finally being constituted into Tribhuvan University since 1959.

Academics
The college offers numerous programs across science and humanities. In science, it runs  BSc and MSc programs; while in humanities, it offers BA and MA programs.

Faculty of Humanities and Social Sciences 
 Department of Nepali 
 Department of philosophy and Psychology
 Department of Economics

Faculty of Sciences 
 Department of Geology 
 Department of Meteorology
 Department of Physics
 Department of Mathematics
 Department of Statistics 
 Department of Chemistry
 Department of Environmental Science
 Department of Zoology
 Department of Botany 
 Department of Microbiology
 Department of Sociology

Notable alumni

See also 
 Tribhuvan University
 List of universities and colleges in Nepal

References

Universities and colleges in Nepal
Educational institutions established in 1918
Education in Kathmandu
Tribhuvan University
1918 establishments in Nepal
Tri-Chandra College